Gymnopilus baileyi is a species of mushroom in the family Hymenogastraceae.

See also

 List of Gymnopilus species

baileyi
Taxa named by Miles Joseph Berkeley
Taxa named by Christopher Edmund Broome